The 2008 TSC Stores Tankard, the Ontario men's curling championship, was held February 4-10 at the Waterloo Memorial Recreation Complex in Waterloo.

The event featured 11 teams, instead of the usual 10, since the Glenn Howard team was granted an automatic bye for having won the Brier the previous year. 

Team Glenn Howard would repeat their third straight provincial championship, defeating 2000 champion Peter Corner in the final.

Qualification

Teams

* Skips, throws third rocks

Standings

Tie breakers
Tuck 9-4 Middaugh
Lobel 9-8 Tuck

Playoffs

1 vs. 2 

3 vs. 4 

Semifinal 

Final

References

External links

Tsc Stores Tankard, 2008
Ontario Tankard
Sport in Waterloo, Ontario
Curling in Ontario
2008 in Ontario